Kalki is a 2019 Indian Malayalam-language action crime film directed by Praveen Prabharam, co-written by Praveen Prabharam and Sujin Sujathan, and produced by Suvin K. Varkey and Prasobh Krishna for their studio Little Big Films. The film stars Tovino Thomas in the lead role, while Shivajith Padmanabhan, Samyuktha Menon, and Vini Vishwa Lal play the negative roles. In the film, a cop named K takes charge at a village named Nanchenkotta, where he tries to restore peace and locks horns with a political leader.

Plot
Nanchenkotta is a fictional place on the Kerala-Tamil Nadu border which is ruled by Amarnath, who is the leader of the party DYP. The party threatens and tortures the people to keep them under control and everyone lives in fear. Due to this, many residents left the land and are living in neighbouring places. At present, the place was filled with goons under Amarnath's command. The party is  also involved in illegal businesses like gun production and the other known members of the party are Amarnath's brother Appu and their cousin Dr. Sangeetha. Another rival party headed by Adv. Lakshmanan participates in election, but to no avail due to the influence of Amarnath. Adv. Lakshmanan gives a speech in favour of the locals and goes against DYP and asks for the vote of the local people. After the speech, Lakshmanan was killed by Amarnath's henchman Ummar. 

Even though there was a police station, the law was in Amarnath's hands and the cops were unable to take any action against him. After his daughter criticise him for not taking any action in the murder case of Lakshmanan and after thinking about his inability, SI Vyshakan, who is in-charge of Nanchenkotta, commits suicide. Meanwhile, the new leader of the rival party along with his subordinates starts taking their own decisions without thinking about the people. They conduct a meeting to select the candidate for the upcoming election (against DYP's candidate Appu). The new decisions were not welcomed well and as a senior party member named Sooraj and several other members leave the party to work for the people on their own. The same day, the new leader lends a goon out of town to murder Amarnath, but he ends up dying by Amarnath's hands. A nameless SI (simply referred to as "K") arrives at Nanchenkotta, where he burns a goon alive who had taken over the police station. 

After this, K rallies the other cops and starts clearing Amarnath's goons using illegal methods. Fearing the new officer's wrath most of the goons change their ways. K also visits the illegal gun manufacturing site run by Appu and threatens him to shut it down. In response, Ummar arrives at the police station and threatens K, only to be thrashed by him and K orders him not to work under Amarnath from. Under the command of Amarnath, Ummar does various activities to make K leave the town or kill him but to no avail. In a final attempt, he attacks two policemen and one loses his leg in the process. An agitated K tracks down Ummar in a factory and thrashes him and his allies, where he finally chops off Ummar's legs with a chainsaw along with his crew. Sooraj meets K and tells him about the people, who have left the place and the problems, where he requests his help to convince the people to arrive back. 

K starts working for the people against DYP which enrages Amarnath. Amarnath's goons kill a policeman in response and stabs K, but K manages to defeat them. In the next step, Amarnath murders Sooraj which pulls down the confidence of the locals. K kidnaps Appu and thrashes him severely that he falls into a coma. Amarnath is forced to kill Appu to end his suffering. After Appu's death, Sangeetha becomes the candidate, but leaves for Hyderabad after a cop threatens her. Having lost Appu, Amarnath vows to kill K and asks him to arrive for a final battle. In the subsequent fight, Amarnath overpowers K, but the latter prevails and defeats him. K drags Amarnath's body through the streets and orders no one to move until the prison authorities arrive. The people, who had left arrives and walks over Amarnath's unconscious body, thus establishing peace in Nanchenkotta. As his work is done, K leaves the place unnoticed. A few months later, in an unknown place in Tamil Nadu, a goon threatens the locals, but is knocked by K, who has arrived to restore peace and order in the place too.

Cast

 Tovino Thomas as SI K/Kalki 
 Shivajith Padmanabhan as Amarnath
 Sudheesh as HC Abdullah
 James Elia as ASI Kuttan Pillai
 Samyuktha as Dr. Sangeetha
 Dheeraj Denny as Constable Govind
 Siyad Yadhu as Constable Biju
 KPAC Lalitha as Lalithabhai
 Vini Vishwa Lal as Appu
 Harish Uthaman as Ummer
 Saiju Kurup as Sooraj
 Aparna Nair as Aavani
 Aneesh Gopal as Shashankan
 Irshad as SI Vaishakhan
 Anjali Nair as Vaishakan's Wife
 Kritika Pradeep as Swapna
 Jilu Joseph as Abdullah's wife
 Anand Bal as Adv. Lakshmanan
 Nazir Mubarak as Jijo

Production
Kalki was announced by Tovino Thomas on 16 September 2018 through his Facebook page. The film is produced by Suvin K. Varkey and Prasobh Krishna under their production house Little Big Films. The first-look poster of the film was also released during the film announcement. Tovino Thomas is portraying the lead role as a police officer, and Samyuktha Menon is playing the female lead. Saiju Kurup playing a supporting role.Principal photography began on 12 March 2019 with a customary pooja function held at Kochi. Filming took place at Tenkasi, Tamilnadu and Kundara, Kerala. The shooting was completed on 29 May 2019 in a single schedule with 62 days of filming.

Music

Composer Jakes Bejoy provided the music for the film.
The soundtrack album is distributed by the label Goodwill Music.

Release
The movie got released worldwide on 8 August 2019. In Kerala the movie was released across 161 theaters. Outside India the movie was released on same day itself across theaters in UAE, Oman, Kuwait, Singapore, United States and Canada.

Reception

Critical response
In its review, Sify has termed ‘Kalki’ as a hardcore masala entertainer that celebrates its hero. Kalki is an action flick that is a gripping ride for sure, especially if you have an idea about what you are going to see. It is a delightful Tovino Thomas show that is definitely worth a watch. Anjana George of The Times of India has rated the film as 3.5/5 and mentioned that “If you love to enjoy an adrenaline rush, Tovino’s looks and action sequences with blood, Kalki is for you.” Litty Simon from news portal Manorama Online in its review mentioned that “ Tovino Thomas fits the bill as fiery cop. This is the first time that Tovino is seen in a complete action avatar and he does justice.”  Vidya Nair from Deccan Chronicle has mentioned that larger-than-life portrayal of action has made Kalki an entertaining and one of the fine movies of this year.

References

External links
 
 

Indian crime action films
Films shot in Tirunelveli
Films shot in Kollam
2019 films
2010s Malayalam-language films
Films scored by Jakes Bejoy
2019 action thriller films